Deh Iji (also Romanized as Deh Ījī; also known as Da‘chī, Da echī, Da‘ījī, Deh Eījī, Deh Ichi, and Dehjī) is a village in Howmeh Rural District, in the Central District of Andimeshk County, Khuzestan Province, Iran. At the 2006 census, its population was 305, in 54 families.

References 

Populated places in Andimeshk County